What You Don't Know may refer to:
"What You Don't Know" (David Belbin novel), second in 'Bone and Cane' sequence
What You Don't Know (Exposé album)
"What You Don't Know" (Exposé song), its title track
What You Don't Know (Jon Randall album)
"What You Don't Know" (Monrose song)
"What You Don't Know", a song by Jonatha Brooke, the theme song for the TV series Dollhouse

See also
You Don't Know (disambiguation)